The Arsuz bleak (Alburnus kotschyi)  is a species of freshwater cyprinid fish found in rivers draining into the Gulf of İskenderun, including the Seyhan River and Ceyhan River in Turkey.

References

Alburnus
Fish described in 1941
Endemic fauna of Turkey